Yonah Schimmel's Knish Bakery is a bakery and restaurant, located at 137 East Houston Street (between First Avenue and Second Avenue), in the Lower East Side, Manhattan, that has been selling knishes on the Lower East Side since 1890. Its current location on Houston Street opened in 1910.

As the Lower East Side has changed over the decades and many of its Jewish residents have departed, Yonah Schimmel's is one of the few distinctly Jewish businesses and restaurants that remain as a fixture of this largely departed culture and cuisine.

As cited in The Underground Gourmet, a review of Yonah Schimmel's in a collection of restaurant reviews by Milton Glaser and Jerome Snyder, "No New York politician in the last 50 years has been elected to office without having at least one photograph showing him on the Lower East Side with a knish in his face."

History 

About 1890, Yonah Schimmel, a Romanian immigrant, used a pushcart to start his knish bakery. As business grew, a small store on Houston Street was rented by Yonah and his cousin Joseph Berger. When Yonah left the business a few years later, Berger took over the business, retaining the original name. In 1910, the Bergers moved the business to the south side of Houston Street, at its current location. Yonah Schimmel's has been family owned since its inception and is currently operated by Yonah's great nephew, Alex Wolfman.

In 1995, the shop's then-owner, Sheldon Keitz, was implicated in a loan-sharking scheme. The shop was amongst the locations where loans were repaid.

It is as much a landmark as an eatery and has frequently been an artist's subject. A portrait of the Yonah Schimmel Knish Bakery by Hedy Pagremanski (b. 1929) is in the permanent collection of the Museum of the City of New York. Jewish-Irish painter Harry Kernoff painted this bakery on a trip to New York in 1939. More recently it features in the 2009 Woody Allen film Whatever Works.

The restaurant offers a number of varieties of knishes, including the traditional potato and kasha (buckwheat groats) knishes, known for using the same recipe since the bakery's opening, in addition to other kinds of Eastern European food such as borscht, and runs a takeout business. In recent years the restaurant has delivered its knishes nationally through Goldbelly, and has been featured in the site's Youtube series.

See also
 List of Ashkenazi Jewish restaurants
 List of bakeries
 List of delicatessens
 List of kosher restaurants
 Jews in New York City

References

External links

Official website

1890 establishments in New York (state)
Ashkenazi Jewish restaurants
Ashkenazi Jewish culture in New York City
Bakeries of the United States
Jewish delicatessens in the United States
Jews and Judaism in Manhattan
Kosher bakeries
Milchig restaurants
Restaurants in Manhattan
Romanian-Jewish culture in New York (state)
Restaurants established in 1890